Steven Peikin is an American lawyer, who began his career as a prosecutor and later transitioned to white collar criminal defense for the law firm Sullivan & Cromwell, where he was Managing Partner. On June 8, 2017 he was appointed as co-director of the Securities and Exchange Commission (SEC) Enforcement Division, a title he shares with Stephanie Avakian. The division is responsible for overseeing investigations into misconduct in the financial markets and brings civil suits against those who have committed fraud or other financial crimes.

Education
Peikin majored in history while an undergraduate at Yale University (class of 1988) and earned a J.D. degree from Harvard Law School (class of 1991), both magna cum laude.

Career 
From 1996 to 2004, Peikin served as an assistant U.S. attorney, overseeing the securities and commodities task force for the Southern District of New York. The group pursues crimes including accounting fraud, insider trading and market manipulation. Among his cases that gathered the most media attention was his conviction of Frank Quattrone, although an appeals court later overturned that judgement. He also helped prosecute WorldCom Inc. Chief Executive Bernard Ebbers, who was convicted and sentenced to 25 years in prison for accounting fraud.

Among his clients in private practice at Sullivan & Cromwell, Mr. Peikin has helped represent Barclays against accusations of sanctions violations, LIBOR manipulation and insider trading and Goldman Sachs Group, during a U.S. Senate investigation of its trading and warehousing of aluminum and other commodities. In 2015, he represented Michael Coscia, a high-frequency trader convicted of "spoofing," in the first-of-its-kind prosecution by the government. Spoofing had been made illegal by the 2010 Dodd-Frank Act.

The SEC's ethics rules bar Peikin from supervising any cases that affect Goldman or other clients of Sullivan & Cromwell for one year.

As co-chair of the division, he has cited cybercrime as one of the biggest threats to the financial markets and an enforcement priority of the agency. As co-head of enforcement, Peikin has some latitude in setting enforcement and prosecution direction for the agency.

References 

American lawyers
Living people
Sullivan & Cromwell partners
Yale University alumni
Harvard Law School alumni
Year of birth missing (living people)
U.S. Securities and Exchange Commission personnel